
Year 428 BC was a year of the pre-Julian Roman calendar. At the time, it was known as the Year of the Consulship of Cossus and Cincinnatus or Cincinnatus and Atratinus (or, less frequently, year 326 Ab urbe condita). The denomination 428 BC for this year has been used since the early medieval period, when the Anno Domini calendar era became the prevalent method in Europe for naming years.

Events

By place

Greece 
 The chief city of Lesbos, Mytilene, revolts against Athenian rule. The Spartan admiral, Alcidas, leads 40 Peloponnesian alliance ships with the aim of assisting the inhabitants of Mytilene. However, the rebellion by Mytilene is crushed before his forces can arrive.
 Despite encouragement from the Ionian leaders to engage the Athenians, Alcidas declines. Rather, Alcidas leads his fleet to Cyllene where the Spartans resolve to strengthen the fleet and send it to Corcyra where a revolution has broken out. Spartan leaders, Brasidas and Alcidas, then defeat a fleet of Corcyran ships. However, they retire when word reaches them that 60 Athenian ships from Leucas under the command of Eurymedon have been dispatched to intercept them.

Italy 
 The Greek colony of Cumae in Italy falls to the Samnites, who begin to take control of the Campanian plain.

By topic

Literature 
 Euripides' play Hippolytus is performed in the Dionysia competition, the famous Athenian dramatic festival. The play is awarded first prize.
 Sophocles writes Oedipus Rex.
</onlyinclude>

Births 
 Archytas, Greek philosopher, mathematician, astronomer, statesman, and strategist (d. 347 BC)

Deaths 
 Anaxagoras, Greek philosopher (b. c. 500 BC)

References